The 2007–08 William & Mary Tribe men's basketball team represented The College of William & Mary during the 2007–08 college basketball season. This was head coach Tony Shaver's fifth season at William & Mary. The Tribe competed in the Colonial Athletic Association and played their home games at Kaplan Arena. They finished the season 17–16, 10–8 in CAA play and lost in the championship game of the 2008 CAA men's basketball tournament to George Mason after a surprising run through the tournament with wins against Georgia State in the first round, rivals Old Dominion in the quarterfinals, and VCU in the semifinals. They did not participate in any post-season tournaments.

References

William and Mary Tribe
William & Mary Tribe men's basketball seasons
William and Mary Tribe
William and Mary Tribe